Thomas Edward Hughes (25 December 1886 – 19 August 1981) was an Australian rules footballer who played with Carlton in the Victorian Football League (VFL), usually playing on the wing or in defence.

Military service
He enlisted in the First AIF on 27 November 1915.

Some mistaken sources, confusing Hughes with one of two other AIF men of the same name who were killed in action, claim that he had been killed in the Somme during World War I; when, in fact, he returned to Australia on 23 June 1919.

Other mistaken sources based their statements on the obituary of "Private Tom Hughes" that appeared in The Winner of 6 June 1917, without having seen the retraction notice published a week later, that clearly stated that the deceased "Private Tom Hughes" was not one and the same as the "Gunner Tom Hughes" who once played for Carlton.

Death
He died on 19 August 1981.

Footnotes

References
 Holmesby, Russell & Main, Jim (2007). The Encyclopedia of AFL Footballers. 7th ed. Melbourne: Bas Publishing.
 First World War Service Record: Gunner Thomas Edward Hughes (14581), National Archives of Australia.
 First World War Nominal Roll: Gunner Thomas Edward Hughes (14581), Australian War Memorial.

External links

1886 births
1981 deaths
People born at sea
Australian rules footballers from Victoria (Australia)
Carlton Football Club players
Leopold Football Club (MJFA) players
Australian military personnel of World War I
Military personnel from Victoria (Australia)